The C6A1 FLEX is a Canadian 7.62x51mm NATO general-purpose machine gun and an improved version of the earlier C6 machine gun, the Canadian version of the FN MAG. The C6A1 FLEX began to replace the C6 in Canadian military service from September 2018 onwards, with final deliveries taking place in June 2019. The C6A1 is manufactured by Colt Canada, with the company having earlier provided support for the original C6 fleet, and is the first support machine gun to have been manufactured in Canada since the Second World War.
Improvements include a polymer buttstock which is more durable and easier to decontaminate in case of a nuclear, chemical or biological attack than the original wooden stock, M1913 picatinny rails for the attachment of pointing devices and optical sighting systems, and an adjustable gas tube regulator to control the rate of fire.

Users

References

Firearms of Canada
General-purpose machine guns